Major General Sir Harry Barron,  (11 August 1847 – 27 March 1921) was a British Army officer who served as Governor of Tasmania from 1909 to 1913, and Governor of Western Australia from 1913 to 1917.

Life
Barron was born in 1847 and attended Stubbington House School. In 1877 he married Clara Emily, daughter of Major General T. Conyngham Kelly; they had one daughter.

Barron was Governor of Tasmania from 1909 to 1913, and Governor of Western Australia from 1913 to 1917.

In 1920, he was made colonel commandant of the Royal Artillery.

References

Notes

General references
A. B. Keith, Responsible Government in the Dominions, vol 1 (Oxford, 1928); Mercury (Hobart), 28 Dec 1912; West Australian (Perth), 13 Mar 1913, 3–8, 26, 27 Feb 1917.

|-

1847 births
1921 deaths
People from Denmark Hill
Graduates of the Royal Military Academy, Woolwich
Royal Artillery officers
British Army major generals
Commanders of the Royal Victorian Order
Governors of Tasmania
Governors of Western Australia
Knights Commander of the Order of St Michael and St George
People educated at Stubbington House School